Cellular Signalling is a peer-reviewed scientific journal focusing on various aspects of cell signalling.

Abstracting and indexing 
Cellular Signalling is abstracted and indexed in:

According to the Journal Citation Reports, the journal has a 2010 impact factor of 4.243.

References

External links 
 

Molecular and cellular biology journals
Publications established in 1989
Monthly journals
English-language journals
Elsevier academic journals